Song of the Islands is a 1942 musical comedy film starring Betty Grable and Victor Mature. It was directed by Walter Lang and released through 20th Century Fox.

Plot

Jeff Harper sails to the tropical paradise Ahmi-Oni with his sidekick Rusty. He is there on behalf of his father, to bargain for land with Dennis O'Brien. Jeff, however, falls in love with O'Brien's daughter Eileen, and it is then up to Jeff's father to go to the island and try to break them up. This proves to be a task easier said than done, because Jeff's father also falls under the spell of the beautiful splendor of the islands.

Cast

Betty Grable as Eileen O'Brien
Victor Mature as Jeff Harper
Jack Oakie as Rusty Smith
Thomas Mitchell as Dennis O'Brien
George Barbier as Jefferson Harper Sr.
Hilo Hattie as Palola
Billy Gilbert as Palola's father
Lillian Porter as Paulani
 Uncredited actors include Filipino Hollywood actor Rudy Robles as "Akomi", the native boy.

Background

Betty Grable had recently scored major hits with her leading roles for Fox. Films such as Down Argentine Way and Tin Pan Alley both in 1940 as well as Moon Over Miami, A Yank in the RAF and I Wake Up Screaming all in 1941. After the success of Song of the Islands, Fox realized they had a gold mine on their hands and kept lavishing Grable with Technicolor musicals and an increasing salary.

Her co star was meant to be John Payne but he dropped out so he could make To the Shores of Tripoli and was replaced by Victor Mature. Mature had to drop out of Highway to Hell and was replaced by Cesar Romero. Filming began on 20 October 1941.

In the 1979 film Yanks, set during World War II, there is a larger poster of the film on the wall.

References

External links
 
 

1942 films
1942 musical comedy films
20th Century Fox films
Films directed by Walter Lang
Films set in Hawaii
American musical comedy films
1940s American films